The St. John's Junior Hockey League is a Junior B ice hockey league in Newfoundland and Labrador, Canada, sanctioned by Hockey Canada.  Founded in 1980, the SJJHL was a recognized Junior A league from 1989 until 1991.  This stretch as a Junior A league marks the last time any Newfoundland or Labrador league competed in the Junior A National Playdowns.

History
Founded in 1980, the SJJHL competed as a Junior A league from 1989 until 1991. In that time period, they were eligible for the Centennial Cup Canadian National championship of Junior A hockey.  Every other year the SJJHL has operated at the Junior B level and its champion represents the league in the Veitch Memorial Cup playdowns against the winner of the Central/West Junior Hockey League for the right to play at the Don Johnson Cup.

In the 1970s, there was another league known as the St. John's Junior Hockey League.  Much like the Corner Brook League, Southern Shore League, amongst other leagues, the old SJJHL was a junior-aged town league.  Although the St. John's Jr. Capitals were a top team in this town league, they would represent St. John's for the Veitch Memorial Trophy as an all-star team of players from the old SJJHL.  On one such occasion, in 1972, the Jr. Capitals entered into the first-year Newfoundland Jr. A playdowns, only to win and compete in the 1972 Centennial Cup National Playdowns.

Teams
Presently in their 2021-22 season, the SJJHL is operating with 8 teams.

Former Teams

Brother Rice Celtics 1980-1982
St. John's Guards 1980-1982
St. John’s PWC 1980-1981
St. John’s Jr. Shamrocks 1980-1987
St. John’s Gonzaga 1981-1982
St. John's Jr. 50's 1982-1993
Conception Bay South Raiders 1982-1995
Clarenville Jr. Caribous 1983-1989
St John's Jr. Celtics 1984-2014
St John’s Jr. Canadiens 1985
St John’s AAA Midgets 1988-2000
Bay Arena Rovers 1988-1989
Bell Island Jr. Blues 1996-2010
Conception Bay South Coachman 1998-2001
Northeast Jr. Eagles 1998-2002
Avalon Pacers 1999-2000
St John’s AAA Maple Leafs 2000-2007
Goulds Pacers 2001
Mount Pearl Jr. Wild 2013-2014
Northeast Celtics 2014-2016
Trinity-Placentia Flyers 2011-2021

Champions

Italics represent Veitch Memorial Trophy Champions
Bold represents Provincial Junior A Champions

In 2022, the League renamed the SJJHL Championship from the President's Cup to the Taylor Cup in honour of the late Gerry Taylor, the founding father of the SJJHL who was affectionately known as Mr. Junior Hockey in Newfoundland and Labrador.

Due to the Covid-19 pandemic, the SJJHL did not award the championship in the 2019-20 and 2020-21 seasons.

Non-League Champion, Provincial Champion
These teams won the Veitch Memorial Trophy without winning the SJJHL playoffs.
1984 St. John's Jr. 50's
1996 Avalon Jr. Capitals
2000 Conception Bay North Jr. Stars
2003 St. John's Jr. Celtics
2007 Bell Island Jr. Blues
2009 St. John's Jr. Caps

Atlantic Jr. B Champions
These teams won the Don Johnson Cup as Atlantic Junior B Champions.
1982 St. John's Br. Rice Celtics
1985 St. John's Jr. 50's
1986 Mount Pearl Jr. Blades
1987 St. John's Jr. 50's
1988 St. John's Jr. 50's
2009 St. John's Jr. Caps

Executive 
The St. John's Junior Hockey League is governed by an elected executive with ten members, nine of whom are voting members.

See also
List of ice hockey teams in Newfoundland and Labrador

External links
League Website

Ice hockey leagues in Newfoundland and Labrador
B